Hemliga byrån was a Swedish synthpop group with Swedish writers Anders Jacobsson and Sören Olsson. One of their most famous songs, Hej, hej, hemskt mycket hej, became a 1987 Svensktoppen hit. Another famous song was Hjärtattack. They also acted as house band for the TV series Trollkontroll in 1990, featuring a music video in each episode.

Discography
1986 - Hej, Hej, hemskt mycket hej: vinyl single
1987 - Hej, Hej, hemskt mycket hej: LP album
1987 - Attji: vinyl single
1987 - Tidlösa tiden: vinyl single with Ko-Benkes Trio
1990 - Hjärtattack: vinyl single
1990 - Det ska va körv: vinyl single

References

Culture in Örebro
Swedish synthpop groups